Massachusetts House of Representatives' 7th Hampden district in the United States is one of 160 legislative districts included in the lower house of the Massachusetts General Court. It covers parts of Hampden County and Hampshire County. Democrat Jacob Oliveira of Ludlow has represented the district since 2021.

Towns represented
The district includes the following localities:
 part of Belchertown
 part of Chicopee
 Ludlow
 part of Springfield

The current district geographic boundary overlaps with those of the Massachusetts Senate's 1st Hampden and Hampshire district and Hampden district.

Former locales
The district previously covered:
 Agawam, circa 1872 
 Granville, circa 1872 
 Longmeadow, circa 1872 
 Southwick, circa 1872 
 West Springfield, circa 1872

Representatives
 George H. Chapman, circa 1858 
 James Renney, circa 1858 
 George M. Stearns, circa 1859 
 Albert Fuller, circa 1859 
 A. Olin Brooks, circa 1888 
 Samuel F. Brown, circa 1920 
 Thomas T. Gray, circa 1951 
 David Michael Hartley, circa 1975 
 William D. Mullins, 1977–1986
 Thomas Petrolati, 1987-2021
 Jacob R. Oliveira, 2021-Current

See also
 List of Massachusetts House of Representatives elections
 Other Hampden County districts of the Massachusetts House of Representatives: 1st, 2nd, 3rd, 4th, 5th, 6th, 8th, 9th, 10th, 11th, 12th
 Hampden County districts of the Massachusett Senate: Berkshire, Hampshire, Franklin, and Hampden; Hampden; 1st Hampden and Hampshire; 2nd Hampden and Hampshire
 List of Massachusetts General Courts
 List of former districts of the Massachusetts House of Representatives

Images
Portraits of legislators

References

External links
 Ballotpedia
  (State House district information based on U.S. Census Bureau's American Community Survey).
 League of Women Voters of Northampton Area

House
Government of Hampden County, Massachusetts
Government of Hampshire County, Massachusetts